Cytokeratin 5/6 antibodies are antibodies that target both cytokeratin 5 and cytokeratin 6. These are used in immunohistochemistry, often called CK 5/6 staining, including the following applications:
Identifying basal cells or myoepithelial cells in the breast and prostate.
For breast pathology, also in distinguishing usual ductal hyperplasia (UDH) and papillary lesions (having a mosaic-like pattern) from ductal carcinoma in situ, which is usually negative. Cyclin D1 and CK5/6 staining could be used in concert to distinguish between the diagnosis of papilloma (Cyclin D1 < 4.20%, CK 5/6 positive) or papillary carcinoma (Cyclin D1 > 37.00%, CK 5/6 negative).
In the lung, distinguishing epithelioid mesothelioma (CK5/6 positive in 83%) from lung adenocarcinoma (CK5/6 negative in 85%).

References

Antibodies
Immunohistochemistry
Biochemistry